Geva Kate Mentor CBE (born 17 September 1984) is an England netball international. She has competed in 6 Commonwealth Games: and in the Birmingham 2022 Commonwealth Games she was honoured to read, during the Opening Ceremony, The Athletes Oath on behalf of all the competing athletes. She was a member of the England team that won the gold medal at the 2018 Commonwealth Games. She was also a member of the England teams that won the bronze medal at the 2006 and 2010 Commonwealth Games and at the 2011, 2015 and 2019 Netball World Cups. She captained England at the 2015 Netball World Cup. In 2019 she was appointed a Commander of the Most Excellent Order of the British Empire for her services to netball.

Mentor was a member of the Team Bath teams that won the 2005–06 and 2006–07 Netball Superleague titles. In 2008 she began playing in the ANZ Championship, winning premierships with the 2010 Adelaide Thunderbirds and the 2014 Melbourne Vixens. She captained the Sunshine Coast Lightning teams that won the 2017 and 2018 Suncorp Super Netball titles. Since 2019, Mentor has captained Collingwood Magpies in Suncorp Super Netball.

Early life, family and education
Mentor was born and raised in Bournemouth. She is daughter of Greg and Yvonne Mentor and she has a brother, Raoul. Her mother's family lived in the Dorset area  for five generations. Her father was originally from Saint Lucia. She grew up in Boscombe and attended St Peter's Catholic School. She studied for her A-Levels at the University of Bath's Centre of Excellence. Since 2016, Mentor has studied for a Bachelor for Education with the Swinburne University of Technology.

Playing career

Team Bath
Between 2001 and 2007, Mentor played for Team Bath, initially in the Super Cup and later in the Netball Superleague. In 2004 she was a member of the Team Bath squad that won the Super Cup. In 2005–06, she was a member of Team Bath team that won the inaugural Netball Superleague title. Mentor was Player of the Match in the Grand Final when Team Bath retained the title in 2006–07.

Adelaide Thunderbirds
In 2008, Mentor was one of several England internationals to join the ANZ Championship. Mentor signed for Adelaide Thunderbirds. In 2010, she was a member of the Thunderbirds team that won the premiership. She finished the 2010 season as ANZ Championship Grand Final MVP.

Surrey Storm
Mentor played with Surrey Storm during the 2009–10 Netball Superleague season. In September 2009 herself and Sonia Mkoloma became the first two players to sign for the rebranded franchise. In March 2010, both Mentor and Mkoloma left Surrey Storm to return to the ANZ Championship.

Melbourne Vixens
Between 2011 and 2016, Mentor played for Melbourne Vixens in the ANZ Championship.
 In 2012 she was a member of the Vixens team that were both minor premiers and grand finalists. She was subsequently included in the 2012 ANZ Championship All Star team and was named Vixens' Best and Fairest. In 2013, Mentor was again included in the All Star team. In 2014, Mentor made her 100th ANZ Championship appearance in Round 13 against Adelaide Thunderbirds. Mentor became the first import player to reach 100 games. She subsequently helped Vixens win the 2014 ANZ Championship and was named in a third successive All Star team.
 In 2014 when the Vixens' Best and Fairest award was renamed the Sharelle McMahon Medal, Mentor became the inaugural winner. In 2015 she shared the award with Karyn Bailey.

Sunshine Coast Lightning
In 2016 it was announced that Mentor had signed for Sunshine Coast Lightning in Suncorp Super Netball. In February 2017, she was named captain of the new franchise. She subsequently captained the Lighting teams that won the 2017 and 2018 Suncorp Super Netball titles. Mentor was named the 2017 Suncorp Super Netball Player of the Year. In 2017 and 2018, she was also named as the goalkeeper in the Suncorp Super Netball Team of the Year. Mentor made her 150th ANZ Championship/Suncorp Super Netball appearance in the 2018 Round 5 match against Adelaide Thunderbirds.

Lightning statistics

|- style="background-color: #eaeaea"
! scope="row" style="text-align:center" | 2017
|style="text-align:center;"|Lightning
| 0/0 || 0 || 42 || 0 || 0 || 42 || 97 || 209 || 4 || 16
|- style="background-color: #eaeaea"
! scope="row" style="text-align:center" | 2018
|style="text-align:center;"|Lightning
| 0/0 || 0 || 28 || 0 || 0 || 30 || 121 || 274 || 8 || 16
|- class="sortbottom"
! colspan=2| Career
! 0/0
! 0
! 70
! 0
! 0
! 72
! 218
! 483
! 12
! 32
|}

Collingwood Magpies
Since 2019, Mentor has played for Collingwood Magpies in Suncorp Super Netball. She was named Magpies co-captain ahead of the 2019 season, alongside Madi Robinson. In both 2019 and 2020, Mentor was awarded the Magpies' best and fairest award.  In 2020, Mentor was named as the goalkeeper in the Suncorp Super Netball Team of the Year for a third time.  Mentor made her 200th ANZ Championship/Suncorp Super Netball appearance in the 2021 Round 10 match against Giants Netball. 

Magpies statistics

|- style="background-color: #eaeaea"
! scope="row" style="text-align:center"|2019
|style="text-align:center;"|Magpies
| 0/0 || 0 || 33 || 0 || 0 || 40 || 85 || 217 || 8 || 15
|- style="background-color: #eaeaea"
! scope="row" style="text-align:center"|2020
|style="text-align:center;"|2020 Magpies
| 0/0 || 0 ||25|| 0 || 0 ||27||103||182||11||14
|- style="background-color: #eaeaea"
! scope="row" style="text-align:center"|2021
|style="text-align:center;"|2021 Magpies
| 0/0 || 0 ||  || 0 || 0|| || || || ||  
|- class="sortbottom"
! colspan=2| Career
! 0/0
! 0
! 
! 0
! 0
! 
! 
! 
! 
! 
|}

England
Mentor was first selected for the senior England squad in November 2000 when she was aged 15. She was initially spotted by Lyn Gunson and her ability was recognised by England coaches, Julie Hoornweg and Wai Taumaunu. She made her senior debut on 11 July 2001, aged 16, against New Zealand. On her debut she marked Irene van Dyk. In 2002, Mentor featured at her first Commonwealth Games and in 2003 she played at her first Netball World Cup. She was subsequently a member of the England teams that won the bronze medals at the 2006 and 2010 Commonwealth Games and at the 2011, 2015 and 2019 Netball World Cups. She captained England at the 2015 Netball World Cup. Mentor was a prominent member of the England team that won the gold medal at the 2018 Commonwealth Games. In Sept 2022 Geva was conferred an Honorary Doctorate in Sport by The Chancellor of Chichester University. Also in Nov 2022 Geva was conferred her second Honorary Doctorate in Arts by The Chancellor of Bournemouth University, her home town. In Nov 2022 she officially opened The Geva Mentor Fitness Park, 'a free for all area' on the beachfront of Bournemouth.

Personal life
In 2012 Mentor began a relationship with Lachlan Crawford, a teacher at Camberwell Grammar School. The couple were married in December 2015. However the relationship subsequently broke down and in 2018 they divorced. In 2019, Mentor had a relationship with Mason Cox, the Australian rules footballer who plays for the Collingwood Football Club.

Since 2015, Mentor has been a dual United Kingdom-Australian citizen.

In 2019 Mentor released an autobiography, Leap: Making the jump to take netball to the top of the world.

Honours

England
Commonwealth Games
Winners: 2018
Fast5 Netball World Series
Winners: 2017
Netball Quad Series
Runners Up: 2018 (Sep), 2019 
Sunshine Coast Lightning
Suncorp Super Netball
Winners: 2017, 2018
Melbourne Vixens
ANZ Championship
Winners: 2014
Runners Up: 2012
Adelaide Thunderbirds
ANZ Championship
Winners: 2010
Team Bath
Netball Superleague
Winners: 2005–06, 2006–07
Super Cup
Winners: 2004
Individual Awards

References

External links
 

1984 births
Living people
English netball players
Commanders of the Order of the British Empire
Commonwealth Games bronze medallists for England
Commonwealth Games gold medallists for England
Commonwealth Games medallists in netball
Netball players at the 2002 Commonwealth Games
Netball players at the 2006 Commonwealth Games
Netball players at the 2010 Commonwealth Games
Netball players at the 2018 Commonwealth Games
2019 Netball World Cup players
Team Bath netball players
Surrey Storm players
Sunshine Coast Lightning players
Melbourne Vixens players
Adelaide Thunderbirds players
Collingwood Magpies Netball players
ANZ Championship players
Suncorp Super Netball players
AENA Super Cup players
Netball Superleague players
English expatriate netball people in Australia
English emigrants to Australia
Black British sportswomen
English people of Saint Lucian descent
Sportspeople from Bournemouth
People educated at St Peter's Catholic School, Bournemouth
2011 World Netball Championships players
2015 Netball World Cup players
Netball players at the 2022 Commonwealth Games
Medallists at the 2006 Commonwealth Games
Medallists at the 2010 Commonwealth Games
Medallists at the 2018 Commonwealth Games